KFSZ (106.1 FM, "Hits 106") is an American radio station licensed to serve the community of Munds Park, Arizona.  The station, established in 2008, is owned by Roger and Nancy Anderson, through licensee Southwest Media, Inc.

Programming

, KFSZ broadcasts a contemporary hit radio music format branded as "Hits 106" to the greater Flagstaff, Arizona, area. Before that date, it aired a hot adult contemporary music format branded as "My 106.1" and "Magic 106.1".

History
This station received its original construction permit for a new FM station broadcasting at 106.1 MHz from the Federal Communications Commission (FCC) on February 23, 2005.  The new station was assigned the "KFSZ" call sign by the FCC on March 17, 2006.

Nearly four years after the original construction permit was granted, KFSZ received its license to cover from the FCC on February 13, 2009.

Ownership
In February 2008, LKCM Radio Group, LP (Kevin Prigel, VP/secretary) announced an agreement to sell KFSZ, then still under construction, to OD Broadcasting, LLC (Michael O'Donnell, president) for a reported $2.35 million in cash. The FCC approved the deal on April 18, 2008, but  the transaction was not consummated. Effective July 31, 2015, KFSZ was sold by LKCM Radio Group to Roger and Nancy Anderson's Southwest Media, Inc., at a purchase price of $491,400.

References

External links
KFSZ official website

FSZ
Contemporary hit radio stations in the United States
Radio stations established in 2008
Mass media in Coconino County, Arizona